Kamran Ali Iqbal (born 20 February 1995) is a Norwegian football defender of Pakistani descent who currently plays for Heming.

He started his youth career in Rommen SK, and later joined Vålerenga Fotball.

He made his first-team debut in the first round of the 2013 Norwegian Football Cup. He made his Norwegian Premier League debut in March 2014 against Molde. In 2015, he played for Nest-Sotra and Lørenskog, before joining Bærum ahead of the 2016 season. After two years he went on to Grorud.

Career statistics

References

1995 births
Living people
Footballers from Oslo
Norwegian footballers
Norwegian people of Pakistani descent
Vålerenga Fotball players
Eliteserien players
Norwegian First Division players
Norwegian Second Division players
Nest-Sotra Fotball players
Bærum SK players
Grorud IL players
Association football defenders